Heytesbury was a parliamentary borough in Wiltshire which elected two Members of Parliament. From 1449 until 1707 it was represented in the House of Commons of England, and then in the British House of Commons until 1832, when the borough was abolished by the Reform Act 1832.

History
The borough consisted of a small part of the small market town or large village of Heytesbury, in the south-west of Wiltshire. In 1831, when the population of the whole parish was 1,394, the borough had a population of only 81. Already a small settlement, much of Heytesbury burned to the ground in 1765, but this did not affect its right to return members to parliament. The houses lost were subsequently rebuilt.

Heytesbury was a burgage borough, meaning that the right to vote was reserved to the householders of specific properties or "burgage tenements" within the borough; there were twenty-six of these tenements by the time of the Reform Act, and all had been owned by the heads of the A'Court family since the 17th century, giving them control of the choice of the two Members. Shortly before the Reform Act, the head of the family, Sir William Ashe A'Court, was raised to the peerage as Lord Heytesbury. By 1832 there had been no contested elections for more than half a century.
 
Heytesbury was abolished as a constituency by the Reform Act. Its residents who were qualified to vote were transferred into the new South Wiltshire county division.

Members of Parliament

1449–1640

1640–1832

Notes

References 
 
 Cobbett's Parliamentary history of England, from the Norman Conquest in 1066 to the year 1803 (London: Thomas Hansard, 1808) 
T. H. B. Oldfield, The Representative History of Great Britain and Ireland (London: Baldwin, Cradock & Joy, 1816)
 J Holladay Philbin, Parliamentary Representation 1832 – England and Wales (New Haven: Yale University Press, 1965)
 

Parliamentary constituencies in Wiltshire (historic)
Constituencies of the Parliament of the United Kingdom established in 1449
Constituencies of the Parliament of the United Kingdom disestablished in 1832
Rotten boroughs